Ron Smith (6 May 1917 – 19 January 1998) was an Australian rules footballer who played with Collingwood in the Victorian Football League (VFL).		
		
His brother Stan also played for Collingwood.

Notes

External links 

		
Profile on Collingwood Forever

1917 births
1998 deaths
Australian rules footballers from Victoria (Australia)
Collingwood Football Club players